Reçber is a Turkish surname. Notable people with the surname include:

 Hakan Reçber (born 1999), Turkish taekwondo practitioner 
 Rüştü Reçber (born 1973), Turkish football goalkeeper and sports executive

Turkish-language surnames